The Edinboro Fighting Scots are the athletic teams that represent Pennsylvania Western University Edinboro (known before July 2022 as Edinboro University of Pennsylvania), located in Edinboro, Pennsylvania, in NCAA Division II intercollegiate sports. The Fighting Scots are members of the Pennsylvania State Athletic Conference (PSAC) for 15 of 17 varsity sports. The wrestling team competes in the Mid-American Conference (MAC) as a member of NCAA Division I and the wheelchair basketball team competes outside of NCAA governance in the NWBA Intercollegiate Division. The Fighting Scots have been a member of the PSAC since its foundation in 1951.

History
The men's and women's cross country and track programs won the only national titles in school history and the NAIA men's national championship in 1975 and 1976 and winning the NCAA men's national championship in 1986, 1987, 1988, and 1990. Edinboro added women's lacrosse for the 2008 season. In accordance with PennWest Edinboro's commitment to serving students with physical disabilities, it has one of the nation's best wheelchair basketball teams. The team hosts an annual tournament, the Boro Shootout.

Conferences

Primary
1908–1950: Independent
1951–present: Pennsylvania State Athletic Conference

Single sport
1988–2019: Eastern Wrestling League (wrestling)
2019–present: Mid-American Conference (wrestling)
1996–present: National Wheelchair Basketball Association Intercollegiate Division (wheelchair basketball)

Varsity teams

List of teams

Men's sports (8)
Basketball
Cross country
Football
Swimming
Tennis
Track and field
Wheelchair basketball
Wrestling (Division I)

Women's sports (9)
Basketball
Cross country
Lacrosse
Soccer
Softball
Swimming
Tennis
Track and field
Volleyball

National championships

Team

Individual sports

Cross Country
The cross country teams are the most successful athletic program at Edinboro and among the most consistent in Division II with 48 conference titles (30 men's & 18 women's). Formed in 1969 by legendary coach Doug Watts, the team quickly grew into a national powerhouse, winning 2 NAIA titles in 1975 and 1976. The program won 4 NCAA championships in 1986, 1987, 1988, and 1990. Under Watts, Edinboro would qualify the national meet for 31 straight years (1979-2009, a Division II record). He has also produced 4 individual national champions and multiple All-Americans. Watts served as head coach for 44 years before retiring in 2013. Since 2021, the program has been led by Nathan Meeuwenberg.

Wrestling
Edinboro has one of the premier Division I wrestling programs.  Prior to moving to the Division I level in 1986, Edinboro was already a national power at the NAIA and NCAA Division II levels.  Edinboro has been fortunate to be home of one of the greatest Olympic and amateur wrestlers in the world, Bruce Baumgartner.  Baumgartner came to Edinboro in 1984 as an assistant coach, and was promoted to head coach in 1991.  He guided the Fighting Scots to three top 15 finishes in the NCAA Division I Wrestling Championships.  The team currently continues to excel as a top program.  Baumgartner became the Director of Athletics in 1997. All in all, Edinboro's wrestling program has produced 120 Pennsylvania State Athletic Conference champions, 59 Eastern Wrestling League champions, 60 NCAA All-Americans, 4 NCAA Division I champions, 9 NCAA Division II and NAIA national champions, 2 USA Olympic team members, 17 Pennsylvania State Athletic Conference tournament team championships, and 14 Eastern Wrestling League tournament team championships.

Three former Edinboro wrestlers and former All-Americans have transitioned and found success in mixed martial arts. Former NCAA Division I champion Josh Koscheck is a former Ultimate Fighting Championship (UFC) title challenger and current Bellator fighter. Another former NCAA Division I champion Gregor Gillespie is a current UFC fighter. Former NCAA Division I runner-up Chris Honeycutt is a current Bellator fighter.

The current Edinboro University wrestling head coach is Matt Hill, who previously served as an Assistant at Kent State. Hill wrestled collegiately at Edinboro.

Former head coach Tim Flynn led the Fighting Scots from 1998-2018. Tim Flynn was an All-American himself while in the NCAA at Penn State University in 1987, winning the EWL title and finishing seventh at Nationals. Flynn has received numerous awards for his accomplishments with the program such as: 
Twelve-time PSAC Coach of the Year
Seven-time EWL Coach of the Year
2014 NCAA Division I Coach of the Year

References

External links